LifeProof is a U.S. consumer electronics accessory company headquartered in San Diego, California, and was acquired in 2013 by OtterBox. The company designs, manufactures, and markets cases that protect smartphone and tablet functionality and condition from water, snow, dirt, and shock. Their products include cases, flotation jacketing, belt clips, headphones, chargers, connectors, arm bands, bike mounts, and photography equipment.

History 
LifeProof was founded in 2009 by Gary Rayner. He is a serial entrepreneur and has an MBA in Business from Queensland University of Technology. After 18 months and a $1 million investment, the company made its public debut at the 2011 LAUNCH Conference where it won awards for the best product and best presentation after a demonstration with a LifeProof protected iPhone 4 that included dropping it on the ground, smothering it in ketchup, mustard, and dirt, followed by successfully rinsing it off in a fish tank.

In August 2011, rival manufacturer Otterbox filed a patent suit claiming the company infringed on four properties about protective device enclosures. On October 10, 2012, Ironman announced LifeProof as an official sponsor during the Ironman World Championship in Kona, Hawaii. Announced November 27, 2012, LifeProof became a Participating Sponsor of all 2013 XTERRA Triathlon events, marketing, and media in the United States.  On January 7, 2013, LifeProof announced a partnership with Belkin EMEA. Belkin EMEA will be responsible for the sales and distribution of LifeProof products in Europe.

On May 23, 2013, when the company was acquired by Otterbox for an undisclosed amount, the Colorado court officially terminated the patent suit case.

Products 
The LifeProof Nüüd is a technology that exposes the original screen of the device while protecting the phone from water, dirt, snow, and drop damage. This allows for zero visual interference, glare, loss of contrast or touch interference.  The technology is currently supported on the iPhone 5, iPhone 5s, iPhone 5c, iPhone 6, iPhone 6 Plus, iPhone 6s, iPhone 6s Plus, iPhone SE, iPhone 7, iPhone 7 Plus, Galaxy S3, Galaxy S4, Galaxy S5, iPad, and iPad Mini.

The Lifeproof Frē is a technology based on LifeProof's original technological developments and provides built-in scratch protection to safely shield device touchscreens from damage.  The product is also completely waterproof, dirtproof, snowproof, and dropproof. It is currently available for the iPhone 4s, iPhone 5, iPhone 5s, iPhone 5c, iPhone 6, iPhone 6 Plus, iPhone 6s, iPhone 6s Plus, iPhone SE, iPhone 7, iPhone 7 Plus, Galaxy S3, Galaxy S4, Galaxy S5, Galaxy S6, Galaxy S7, Galaxy S8, Galaxy S9, Droid Turbo, Droid Turbo 2, Droid Maxx 2, LG G5, iPad Mini 1-4, and iPod Touch 5G and 6G. A Lifeproof Frē Power case for the iPhone 6 incorporates a slimline battery to double the battery life of the phone, while protecting the phone from water, dirt, snow, and drop damage.

Technology
LifeProof combines many technologies to create a case that protects electronic devices from the inside out. The case will make the phone waterproof, dirtproof, snowproof, and shockproof.  LifeProof's case for Apple iPhones only adds  to the sides of the phone. The case combines a polycarbonate frame, waterproof acoustic ports, a waterproof screen protector that is still fully touch sensitive, and a built-in optical glass that covers the phone's camera lenses to prevent loss of photographic detail. Every LifeProof case is put together in a two-part snap-together assembly that has a thin polymer gasket where it closes. Each case then becomes fully waterproof after sealing, and also seals the charging port via a hinged, gasketed door.

To waterproof the earphone jack, LifeProof created a screw-in seal that can be used when the jack is not in use. To use the jack and still maintain the waterproof function, LifeProof provides a short waterproof earphone extension wire that screws into the jack on the case. When used with waterproof earphones, this allows a swimmer to listen to music while fully underwater, provided that the swimmer remains near the surface. For deeper submersion or vigorous surfing, a dive case with a higher rating is useful. Optional "Lifejacket Float" flotation jacketing can be added to some models to prevent the equipment from sinking if dropped into water.

LifeProof claims that it water tests every case before shipping. Following the first test, LifeProof will send the case to an independent agent to perform additional tests. If the case passes both tests, the case will be shipped, and if the case does not pass, it will be scrapped. Every LifeProof case meets a military standard as well. The MIL STD 810G-516.6 is the United States Military Standard that deals with the functional drop of an electronic device. The standard requires that the tested item can physically and functionally withstand the frequent, repetitive shocks encountered in transportation, service, and handling. In addition, LifeProof cases meet the international IP-68 standard for dust and water protection. LifeProof recommends that the end user test a new case for waterproofness before installing electronic equipment for usages.

References 

2009 establishments in the United States
Companies based in San Diego